Hapona is a genus of South Pacific araneomorph spiders in the family Toxopidae, and was first described by Raymond Robert Forster in 1970. Originally placed with the intertidal spiders, it was moved to the Toxopidae in 2017.

Species
 it contains thirteen species, all found in New Zealand:
Hapona amira Forster, 1970 – New Zealand
Hapona aucklandensis (Forster, 1964) – New Zealand
Hapona crypta (Forster, 1964) – New Zealand
Hapona insula (Forster, 1964) – New Zealand
Hapona marplesi (Forster, 1964) – New Zealand
Hapona moana Forster, 1970 – New Zealand
Hapona momona Forster, 1970 – New Zealand
Hapona muscicola (Forster, 1964) – New Zealand
Hapona otagoa (Forster, 1964) (type) – New Zealand
Hapona paihia Forster, 1970 – New Zealand
Hapona reinga Forster, 1970 – New Zealand
Hapona salmoni (Forster, 1964) – New Zealand
Hapona tararua Forster, 1970 – New Zealand

References

Araneomorphae genera
Spiders of New Zealand
Taxa named by Raymond Robert Forster
Toxopidae